KMM is a three-letter abbreviation that may refer to:

 Kennedy Miller Mitchell, Australian film, television and video game production company
 Kaspersky Mobile Security, mobile security suite.
 Kesatuan Melayu Muda, Malayan political organization
 Krantikari Manuwadi Morcha, Indian political organization
 Krav Maga Maor, a system of self-defense and hand-to-hand combat system
 Kröller-Müller Museum, the Netherlands
 New Politics Party, in Thailand
 Kumpulan Mujahidin Malaysia, terrorist organization